Elisabeth Clara Heath-Sladen (1 February 1946 – 19 April 2011) was an English actress. She became best known as Sarah Jane Smith in the British television series Doctor Who, appearing as a regular cast member from 1973 to 1976, alongside both Jon Pertwee and Tom Baker, and reprising the role many times in subsequent decades, both on Doctor Who and its spin-offs, K-9 and Company (1981) and The Sarah Jane Adventures (2007–2011).

Sladen was interested in ballet and theatre from childhood, and began to appear on stage in the mid-1960s, although she was more often a stage manager at this time. She moved to London in 1970 and won several television roles, with her acting in the police drama Z-Cars leading to her being recommended for the role in Doctor Who. After leaving the series, she had other roles on both television and radio before semi-retiring to bring up a family in the mid-1980s.

Sladen returned to the public eye in the 2000s with more Doctor Who related appearances, which culminated in taking a regular lead role in The Sarah Jane Adventures. In 2010, the show earned the Royal Television Society Award for Best Children's Drama. She also made regular guest appearances on the main television series and provided voice-over commentaries and interviews for its releases to DVD. She died of cancer on 19 April 2011.

Early life
Elisabeth Clara (or Claira) Heath-Sladen was born 1 February  1946 in Liverpool, England. Sladen was the only child of Tom Sladen (1900–1994), who fought in the First World War and served in the Home Guard during the Second World War, and Gladys (1902–1978) (née Trainer).

She developed an interest in performing at an early age, beginning dance lessons when she was five, and dancing in one production with the Royal Ballet. She was a primary school contemporary of future politician Edwina Currie, appearing in at least one school production with her. She went on to secondary school and attended Aigburth Vale High School for Girls.

Career

Early career
Sladen attended the Elliott-Clarke Drama School.
In 1965, she made her first film appearance in Ferry Cross the Mersey as an uncredited extra. Sladen then joined the Hillbark Players, for their open-air production of Much Ado About Nothing, playing Hero.

After two years at drama school, Sladen began work at the Liverpool Playhouse repertory company as an assistant stage manager. Her first stage appearance at the Playhouse was as a maid in Twelfth Night. A few months later, she played a corpse in The Physicists. However, she was scolded for giggling on stage due to her future husband Brian Miller whispering the words "Respiration nil, Aston Villa two" in her ear while he was playing a doctor. Sladen was such a good assistant stage manager that she did not get many acting roles, a problem that was solved when she accidentally made a mistake on one occasion. An earlier interview indicated that she deliberately made mistakes on several occasions. As a result, she began to get on-stage roles again. She eventually moved into weekly repertory work, travelling to various locations in Britain. Sladen and Miller moved to Manchester, in 1966, spending three years there. They married on 8 June 1968. She appeared in numerous roles, most notably as Desdemona in Othello, her first appearance as a leading lady. She also got the occasional part on Radio Leeds and Granada Television, eventually appearing as barmaid Anita Reynolds in 1970 in six episodes of the long-running soap opera Coronation Street.

In 1969, she and her husband appeared in the play How the Other Half Loves; when in the autumn of 1970 the play moved to London, the couple also moved there. Her first television role in London was in a two-part story of Z-Cars. These two episodes of Z-Cars have since been wiped and are listed as missing episodes by the BBC's archive library. She then appeared as a terrorist in an episode of Doomwatch, followed by guest roles in further episodes of Z-Cars, Public Eye, Some Mothers Do 'Ave 'Em and Special Branch.

Sarah Jane Smith
In 1973, Doctor Who actress Katy Manning, who was playing the Third Doctor's assistant Jo Grant opposite Jon Pertwee, was leaving the series; Z-Cars producer Ron Craddock gave Sladen an enthusiastic recommendation to Doctor Who producer Barry Letts. Sladen arrived at the audition not knowing it was for the new companion role, and was amazed at Letts's thoroughness. She was introduced to Pertwee, whom she found intimidating at the time. As she chatted with Letts and Pertwee, each time she turned to look at one of them the other would signal a thumbs-up. The role of Sarah Jane Smith was originally given to comic actress April Walker, but allegedly during rehearsals for debut story The Time Warrior, doubts over the pairing of Walker and Pertwee surfaced and the part was recast with Sladen.

She stayed on Doctor Who for three-and-a-half seasons, alongside Pertwee as the Third Doctor and Tom Baker as the Fourth. She returned to the character of Sarah Jane Smith on several later occasions. In 1981, new Doctor Who producer John Nathan-Turner asked her to return to the series to ease the transition between Tom Baker and new Doctor Peter Davison. She declined but accepted his second offer of a pilot for a spin-off series called K-9 and Company, co-starring K-9, the robot dog from Doctor Who. Although it won viewing figures of 8.4 million and a positive reception from BBC executives, the pilot was not picked up for a series due to "logistics and changes in BBC management". Sladen's next appearance in the role was in the 20th anniversary special The Five Doctors (1983).

She reprised the role in the 1993 Children in Need special Dimensions in Time, and in the 1995 independently produced video Downtime alongside former co-star Nicholas Courtney as Brigadier Lethbridge-Stewart and Deborah Watling as Victoria Waterfield. This was her last on-screen appearance as Sarah Jane Smith before 2006.

Sladen played Sarah Jane in several audio plays. Two of them were produced for BBC Radio, The Paradise of Death (Radio 5, 1993), and The Ghosts of N-Space (Radio 2, 1996), together with Jon Pertwee and Nicholas Courtney. In 1997, Sladen won Hall of Fame Actress in Cult TV Awards. Big Finish Productions produced two series of Sarah Jane Smith audio adventures set in the present day, released in 2002 and 2006. Her husband, Brian Miller, appeared in the story Ghost Town. Her daughter Sadie appeared in the audios. Sladen also contributed interviews and DVD commentaries to many of the classic Doctor Who serials she co-starred in.

Following the successful revival of Doctor Who in 2005, Sladen guest starred as Sarah Jane in "School Reunion", an episode of the 2006 series, along with David Tennant as the Tenth Doctor. Sladen worked a lot of the characterisation herself—in the lead-up to the broadcast of "School Reunion" she was quoted in the Daily Mirror as saying: "Sarah Jane used to be a bit of a cardboard cut-out. Each week it used to be, 'Yes Doctor, no Doctor', and you had to flesh your character out in your mind—because if you didn't, no one else would." She also spoke favourably of the characterisation in the new series. Sladen won best guest appearance in the annual Cult TV Awards.

Following her successful appearance in the series, Sladen later starred in The Sarah Jane Adventures, a Doctor Who spin-off focusing on Sarah Jane, produced by BBC Wales for CBBC and created by Russell T. Davies. A 60-minute special aired on New Year's Day 2007, with a 10-episode series commencing broadcast in September 2007, followed by a second 12-episode series in late 2008, which carried that same format for the show's third and fourth series up until November 2010. A fifth series originally comprising 12 episodes was commissioned for a late 2011 broadcast, with 6 of the episodes being filmed alongside the show's fourth series, but due to Sladen's unexpected death in April 2011, the latter half never reached production, officially ending the series. The first 6 episodes were broadcast as originally intended in tribute to Sladen in October 2011. The programme won a Royal Television Society 2010 award for Best Children's Drama. Sladen also read original audio stories on CD for The Sarah Jane Adventures, which were released in November 2007: The Glittering Storm and The Thirteenth Stone. This was the first time that BBC Audiobooks had commissioned new content for exclusive release on audio. Further pairs of audio stories were released every year until 2010, all read again by Sladen.

Sladen returned to Doctor Who in the show's fourth series in the concluding episodes "The Stolen Earth" and "Journey's End" and was credited in the title sequence of both episodes. Her final appearance in Doctor Who was a scene in the concluding part of "The End of Time", Tennant's last episode as the Doctor. Just before her death, Sladen had also been interested in being involved in the Doctor Who Fourth Doctor Big Finish series.

Other work
While Sladen was in Doctor Who, she attended numerous public events to publicise the programme. Following her departure, she largely stopped attending related events as she felt it could be seen as bad manners to the new cast.

After her initial run in Doctor Who ended in 1976, she returned to Liverpool with her husband and performed in a series of plays. This included a two-hander with Miller in Mooney and his Caravans. Subsequent appearances include a two-year stint as a presenter for the children's programme Stepping Stones, a lead role with Miller playing her husband in ITV drama Send in the Girls, a BBC Play for Today, a role as a stand-up comic's spouse in Take My Wife, and a small part in the film Silver Dream Racer as a bank secretary in 1980, only her second film appearance.

In 1981, former Doctor Who producer Barry Letts cast her as the female lead in the BBC Classics production of Gulliver in Lilliput. The character of Lady Flimnap was written for Sladen, and she said it was her favourite role. She continued to appear in various television adverts and in another Letts production, Alice in Wonderland (playing the Dormouse).

After the birth of her daughter Sadie in 1985, Sladen went into semi-retirement, placing her family first, but found time for the occasional television appearance.

In 1991, she starred as Alexa opposite Colin Baker in The Stranger audio adventure The Last Mission for BBV Audio. Sladen also appeared in a Bernice Summerfield audio drama, Kate Orman's Walking to Babylon. Following the audio production of The Paradise of Death in 1993, Sladen restarted her regular public appearances in the United Kingdom. In 1995, she played Dr Pat Hewland in four episodes of Peak Practice. In 1996, she played Sophie in Faith in the Future, and appeared in 15 episodes of the BBC schools programme Numbertime, which was repeated annually for around ten years. This was her last television acting appearance until the 2006 Doctor Who episode "School Reunion". In 2008 and 2009, Sladen appeared in a pantomime production of Peter Pan at the Theatre Royal Windsor, playing Mrs. Darling and a beautiful mermaid.

Sladen's last fan event was at the British Film Institute on 12 October 2010, where there was a special showing of The Death of the Doctor, followed by a Q&A session. Her last public appearance was at the EA British Academy Children's Awards on 28 November 2010.

Autobiography
Elisabeth Sladen: The Autobiography was released posthumously on 7 November 2011 by Aurum Press Ltd. The book was launched at 'The Doctor Who Experience', Kensington Olympia on 26 November 2011, in the presence of Brian Miller, Sadie Miller, Tom Baker and Terrance Dicks.
The BBC released an audio CD version of the book, read by fellow Doctor Who alumna Caroline John, on 1 December 2011. The foreword for the book was written by fellow Doctor Who actor David Tennant, who portrayed the tenth Doctor.

Personal life
Sladen married actor Brian Miller on 8 June 1968 in Liverpool. Their daughter, Sadie Miller, appeared alongside Sladen in the 1993 documentary, Thirty Years in the TARDIS, wearing a replica of the Andy Pandy overalls Sladen wore in The Hand of Fear.

Death
Sladen was diagnosed with pancreatic cancer in February 2011 and died on 19 April 2011, though she had once fought it before, over a decade earlier in 1999. She was 65. Her death was widely reported in the UK—on the BBC One Ten O'Clock News; as one of the rolling headlines of the BBC News channel for the day; featuring prominently on many commercial television news reports (including Granada which serves her native Liverpool); on the front page of the Daily Mirror and the Liverpool Echo; and in the obituary features of almost every UK newspaper. The first episode of the sixth series of Doctor Who, "The Impossible Astronaut", aired on the following Saturday, and opened with a screen dedicating the episode to her memory. Straight afterward a special programme called My Sarah Jane: A Tribute to Elisabeth Sladen was aired on CBBC. In 2012 the new companion, Jenna Coleman's character, was named Clara. This was interpreted by some fans as a tribute to Sladen, as her middle name was Clara.

The Hand of Fear was also shown on BBC Four as a tribute. At the British Academy of Film and Television Arts, during the film clips of people who had died in the past year, Sladen was the final person to be shown.
Singer-songwriter Talis Kimberley wrote a tribute song, "Goodnight, Sarah-Jane".
Tom Baker paid tribute to Sladen on his official website saying "sweet memories of happy days with Lis Sladen, the lovely, witty, kind and so talented Lis Sladen".

A tribute to Sladen's character, Sarah Jane Smith, was aired as a final episode of The Sarah Jane Adventures on 19 April 2020, titled "Farewell, Sarah Jane".

Filmography

Television

Personal appearances

Tributes

Film

Radio and CD audio drama

References

External links

 Online TV Interview on Liverpool Reporter hosted by Jonathan Thompson with Elisabeth Sladen in 2006
 BBC Norfolk webTV: Elisabeth Sladen previews The Sarah Jane Adventures
 
 
 
 Elisabeth Sladen at Doctor Who Appreciation Society online archive
 BBC Norfolk webTV: Lis Sladen reflects on School Reunion – October 2006
 BBC Norfolk webTV: Elisabeth Sladen interview from April 2006
 BBC confirm return of Sarah Jane Smith
 
 Den of Geek interview with Elisabeth Sladen

1946 births
2011 deaths
20th-century English actresses
21st-century English actresses
Actresses from Liverpool
Deaths from cancer in England
Deaths from pancreatic cancer
English film actresses
English radio actresses
English stage actresses
English television actresses
National Youth Theatre members